Marshal Tatenda Mudehwe (born 17 August 1993) is a Zimbabwean footballer who plays as a midfielder for Manica Diamonds and the Zimbabwe national team.

Club career
Born in Chitungwiza, Mudehwe played for DC Academy and Black Rhinos in his youth career before making the move into senior football when he joined Platinum, who he signed for in 2013. In January 2019, Mudehwe joined newly-promoted Manica Diamonds after rejecting a new contract from Platinum.

International career
Mudehwe has won 16 caps and scored 2 goals for the Zimbabwe national team.

Career statistics

International
.

International goals
. Scores and results list Zimbabwe's goal tally first.

Honours
Platinum
 Cup of Zimbabwe: 2014
 Zimbabwean Independence Trophy: 2014
 Zimbabwe Premier Soccer League: 2017, 2018

References

External links
 

1993 births
Living people
Zimbabwean footballers
Zimbabwe international footballers
Association football midfielders
Zimbabwe A' international footballers
2016 African Nations Championship players